Grégoire Müller (born February 23, 1947) is a contemporary Swiss painter and writer, who lives in La Chaux-de-Fonds, Switzerland.  His figurative paintings frequently explore current events and world news as documented on television and in print.

Life

Grégoire Müller was born in the town of Morges, Switzerland. In the 1960s, he studied at the Académie de la Grande Chaumière in Paris while becoming acquainted with fellow artists Daniel Buren and Olivier Mosset. During that time he was in charge of the Art page in Pariscope and soon became a correspondent for Art and Artists (London) and Artsmagazine (New York). During the May 68 events Müller was arrested and imprisoned for three days, furthering his interest in counterculture. In 1968, he collaborated with Harald Szeemann on the legendary “When Attitudes become Form” exhibition. In 1969, he left Europe for New York.

In New York, Müller first worked as an assistant to Richard Serra and as a freelance critic before becoming the Editor-in-Chief of Artsmagazine. In that role, he published original contributions by some of the leading artists of the 20th Century, including Salvador Dalí, Robert Rauschenberg, Andy Warhol, Richard Serra, Walter De Maria, Sol LeWitt, Robert Smithson, and Vito Acconci.

In 1972, after the publication of his landmark book “The New Avant Garde” (Praeger Publishing, NY, Pall Mall, London and Alfieri, Milan), Müller began to focus exclusively on painting. Influenced by the work of Lucian Freud and Balthus, among others, he focused on figuration. His first major solo exhibition at Richard Bellamy’s Oil & Steel Gallery (1984) was reviewed by Michael Brenson for the New York Times. In 1986, Müller left New York with his wife, the singer songwriter Pascal, settling in La Chaux-de-Fonds in Switzerland.

In addition to exhibiting his work internationally, Müller has taught at the Haute Ecole d’Art (Neuchâtel) and at the Lycée Blaise Cendrars (La Chaux-de-Fonds).

Work

Müller’s is a figurative painter, who received his early training in life drawing classes at the Académie de la Grande Chaumière in Paris. Over time, he has developed a style that embraces aesthetics found in both Neo-expressionism and Renaissance painting. Deeply involved in the American avant-garde movements of the 1960s, Müller’s understanding of how art can engage us physically is further rooted in Process Art and Minimalism. Since then, he has created works that initiate an immediate physical impact and are often thought of as being confrontational. By the mid-1970s, Müller began to isolate the figure in his compositions, evoking questions of existential angst and struggle. This notion was enhanced through the introduction of political content derived from newspaper images and television.

During the past decade, Müller has developed a new approach, working with oil and turpentine on black denim. Notwithstanding their darkness, his paintings are about light and dramatic chiaroscuro effects. Overall, Müller explores the unique ability of painting to bring images to our consciousness. The human body and face with all its emotional and psychological dimensions are central to his quest. In a broader sense, Müller’s work involves all of what we call Life, including current events, contemporary landscapes and objects.

Müller’s work is found in international museums and collections, including the Museum of Modern Art New York, The Aldrich Contemporary Art Museum, the Henry Art Gallery, Seattle, the Zurich Kunsthaus, Chase Manhattan Bank, and the Nationale Suisse Assurance and the Swiss Confederation. His exhibitions have been reviewed in the New York Times, Art in America, the New Yorker, ARTnews, Neue Zürcher Zeitung, L’Hebdo, Le Temps and other publications. He is prominently featured in the Dictionnaire de l'Art Suisse.

Awards

National Endowment for the Arts, Washington
Joseph James Akston Foundation, New York
Pollock – Krasner Foundation, New York
Robert C. Scull Foundation, New York

Works

Battle Field, 2010, oil on canvas, 24 3/4 x 28 3/4 in.
Burnt Forest, 2008, Oil on canvas, 86 3/4 x 52 inches (220 x 132 cm)
Laughing Man, 2008, Oil on canvas, 20 1/2 x 19 3/4 inches (52 x 50 cm)
Scavenger, 2010, Oil on canvas, 65 1/2 x 54 1/2 inches (166 x 138 cm)
Candle, 2008, Oil on canvas, 23 x 14 3/4 inches (58.4 x 37.5 cm)
Abu Ghraib, 2008, Oil on canvas, 75 x 54 1/2 inches (190.5 x 138.5 cm)

Exhibitions

2011	

Jason McCoy Gallery, New York, NY

2009	

Espace Courant d’art, Porrentruy

2003	

Musée des Beaux Arts, Le Locle

2001	

Musée d’Art et d´Histoire, Neuchâtel

2000	

Galerie Numaga, Auvernier

1997	

E.S.F – Espace Saint-François, Lausanne

1993	

Jason McCoy Gallery, New York, NY
Villa Turque – EBEL (Le Corbusier), La Chaux-de-Fonds
Galerie Carzaniga + Uecker, Basel

1992

Kunsthaus Zürich
Fischlin Gallery, Geneva

1991	

Jason McCoy Gallery, New York, NY
David Grob Gallery, London

1990

 University of Lausanne

1989	

Jason McCoy Gallery, New York, NY
Palais de l’Athénée, Geneva

1988

David Grob Gallery, London
Galerie Carzaniga + Uecker, Basel

1987

Jason McCoy Gallery, New York, NY
Galerie Renée Ziegler, Zurich
Artis Gallery, Monte Carlo

1986

Musée des Beaux Arts, La Chaux-de-Fonds
Gruenebaum Gallery New York

1984	

Oil & Steel Gallery, New York, NY

1977

Kornblee Gallery, New York, NY

1976

Galerie Jean Chauvelin, Paris
Deitcher/O’Reilly Gallery, New York, NY

1975

Deitcher/O’Reilly Gallery, New York, NY

Collections

Museum of Modern Art, NY
Kunsthaus Zürich, Switzerland
Musée des Beaux-Arts, La Chaux-de-Fonds, Switzerland
Musée d’Art et d’Histoire, Neuchâtel, Switzerland
Museo d’Arte di Lugano, Switzerland
Collection of the Swiss Confederation, Bern, Switzerland
Henry Art Gallery, Seattle, WA
The Aldrich Contemporary Art Museum, CT
Fondation Gotti, Museo d’Arte, Lugano
Fondation du Château de Jau, France
Chase Manhattan Bank, New York
Prudential Insurance, New York
Union Bank of Switzerland, New York
Schweizerische Nationalversicherung, Basel
UBS, New York

Catalogues 

Grégoire Müller, New York: Jason McCoy Gallery, NY, 2011
Grégoire Müller, polygraphie, Le Locle: Musée de Beaux-Arts, Le Locle, 2004
Face à la peinture, Neuchâtel: Musée dárt et d´Historie de Neuchâtel, 2001
Grégoire Müller: Recent Paintings, New York: Jason McCoy Gallery, 1989
Grégoire Müller, essay by Donald B. Kuspit, London: David Grob Limited, 1988

Books 

Grégoire Müller, Ramblings: art et survie à Manhattan, 1969–1986, Editions de l'Aire, 1997
Grégoire Müller, New Avantgarde: Issues for the Art of the Seventies, Pall Mall Publishers, 1972

References 

Levin Kim, Gregoire Müller, ARTnews, November 2011

Brenson, Michael, Art: A Rare Exhibition of Modern Swiss Art, The New York Times, Friday, May 17, 1985

Brenson, Michael, Works on Paper, The New York Times, Friday, June 21, 1985

Glueck, Grace, Art: Figures of Mystery Shows New York by 10, The New York Times, Friday, June 21, 1985

Brenson, Michael, Can Political Passion Inspire Great Art? The New York Times, Sunday, April 24, 1984

Henry, Garrit, Gregoire Müller at Oil & Steel, Art in America, October 1984

External links 
  
 
 

1947 births
Living people
Swiss painters
Swiss writers
People from La Chaux-de-Fonds